Friedrich Karl Schmidt (22 September 1901 – 25 January 1977) was a German mathematician, who made notable contributions to algebra and number theory.

Schmidt studied from 1920 to 1925 in Freiburg and Marburg. In 1925 he completed his doctorate at the Albert-Ludwigs-Universität Freiburg under the direction of Alfred Loewy. In 1927 he became a Privatdozent (lecturer) at the University of Erlangen, where he received his habilitation and in 1933 became a professor extraordinarius. In 1933/34 he was a Dozent at the University of Göttingen, where he worked with Helmut Hasse. Schmidt was then a professor ordinarius at the University of Jena from 1934 to 1945. During WW II, he was at the Deutsche Versuchsanstalt für Segelflug  (German Research Station for Gliding) in Reichenhall. He was a professor from 1946 to 1952 at Westfälischen Wilhelms-Universität in Münster and from 1952 to 1966 at the University of Heidelberg, where he retired as professor emeritus.

Schmidt was elected in 1954 a member of the Heidelberger Akademie der Wissenschaften and was made in 1968 an honorary doctor of the Free University of Berlin.

Schmidt is known for his contributions to the theory of algebraic function fields and in particular for his definition of a zeta function for algebraic function fields and his proof of the  generalized Riemann–Roch theorem for algebraic function fields (where the base field can be an arbitrary perfect field). He also made contributions to class field theory and valuation theory.

References

External links

1901 births
1977 deaths
Algebraists
20th-century German mathematicians
Number theorists
University of Freiburg alumni
Academic journal editors